The Harris–Lake Park Community School District, or Harris–Lake Park Schools, is a rural public school district headquartered in Lake Park, Iowa.

The district is spans northwestern Dickinson County and northeastern Osceola County.  It serves the Lake Park, Harris, and the surrounding rural areas.

The school mascot is the Wolf, and their colors are blue and white.

Andy Irwin has been the superintendent since 2017.

Schools
The district operates two schools in Lake Park:
 Harris–Lake Park Elementary School
 Harris–Lake Park High School

Harris–Lake Park High School

Athletics
The Wolves compete in the War Eagle Conference in the following sports:
Football
Cross country
Volleyball
Basketball
Golf
 Boys' 2019 class 1A state champions
Baseball
Softball

The students from Harris–Lake Park can also participate in the following sports as Spirit Lake Park–Okoboji:
Soccer
Tennis
Track and field
Wrestling

See also
List of school districts in Iowa
List of high schools in Iowa

References

External links
 Harris-Lake Park Community School District

School districts in Iowa
Education in Osceola County, Iowa
Education in Dickinson County, Iowa